Hadhrami Arabic, or Ḥaḍrami Arabic (ḤA), is a variety of Arabic spoken by the  Hadhrami people (Ḥaḍārima) living in the region of Hadhramaut in southeastern Yemen, western Oman and southern Saudi Arabia. It is also spoken by many emigrants, who migrated from the Hadhramaut in East Africa (Comoros, Djibouti, Kenya, Somalia, Tanzania, and Mozambique), Southeast Asia (Indonesia, Malaysia, Brunei and Singapore) and, recently, to the other Arab states of the Persian Gulf.

Phonology 
The dialect in many towns and villages in the Wādī (valley) and the coastal region is characterised by its  -yodization, changing the Classical Arabic reflex  to the approximant  . That resembles some Eastern Arabian and Gulf dialects, including the dialects of Basra in Iraq, Kuwait, Qatar, Bahrain other Arab Emirates.

The   reflex is pronounced as a voiced velar  in all lexical items throughout the dialect. In some other Arabic dialects,  is realised as a voiceless uvular plosive  in certain marked lexemes [+ religious], [+ educational]:  “Qur’an”. With the spread of literacy and contact with speakers of other Arabic dialects, future sociolinguistic research may reveal whether using the uvular  in certain lexemes and retaining the velar  for others will occur.

Consonants 

 Sounds  are phonetically noted as lamino-alveolar stops .
  is phonetically noted as an apical-alveolar stop .
  can be heard as a voiced palatal plosive or an affricate sound .
 In the dialects of Al-Qarn, both  and  can be heard as affricated , .
  can be heard as labiodental  when preceding .
  can be heard as a palatal nasal  when following .

Vowels 

In non-emphatic environments,  is realised as an open front (slightly raised) unrounded .

The dialect is characterised by not allowing final consonant clusters to occur in final position. In initial positions, there is a difference between the Wādī and the coastal varieties.

Morphology 
The first person subject plural is naḥnā.

Stem VI, tC1āC2aC3, can be umlauted to tC1ēC2aC3, thus changing the pattern vowel ā to ē. That leads to a semantic change, as in  "they ran away suddenly" and  "they shirk, try to escape."

Intensive and frequentative verbs are common in the dialect. It can be metathesized to become frequentative,  as in  "he made a series (lit. breaks) of giggles or laughs."

Syntax 
The syntax has many similarities to other Peninsular Arabic dialects. However, the dialect contains a number of unique particles used for co-ordination, negation, and other sentence types. Examples in coordination include  "but, nevertheless, though,"  (Classical Arabic ) "as for…," and  "or."

Like many other dialects, apophonic or ablaut passive (as in  "it was written") is not very common, and is mainly confined to clichés and proverbs from other dialects, including Classical Arabic.

Vocabulary 
There are a few lexical items that are shared with Modern South Arabian languages, which perhaps distinguish this dialect from other neighbouring Peninsular dialects. The effect of Hadhrami emigration to Southeast Asia (see Arab Indonesians and Arab Singaporeans), the Indian subcontinent and East Africa is clear in the vocabulary especially in certain registers like types of food and dress:  "sarong." Many loanwords are listed in al-Saqqaf (2006).

See also 
 Varieties of Arabic
 Peninsular Arabic

Notes

External links 
https://www.grin.com/document/882658?lang=en

Arabic languages
Languages of Yemen
Languages of Somalia
Hadhrami people
Mashriqi Arabic
Peninsular Arabic